Enteromius niokoloensis is a species of ray-finned fish in the genus Enteromius from the Gambia River and Senegal River.

Footnotes 

 

Enteromius
Taxa named by Jacques Daget
Fish described in 1959